Anthony Paul Stewart (born 23 November 1956), a former Australian politician, was a Member of the New South Wales Legislative Assembly representing the electorates of Bankstown and Lakemba between 1995 and 2011 for the Labor Party.

He was the Minister for Small Business, Minister for Science and Medical Research and Minister Assisting the Minister for Health (Cancer) in the New South Wales State Government from 8 September 2008 until 11 November 2008. He was dismissed by Premier Nathan Rees after allegations that he had verbally and physically harassed a staff member. Stewart later sought to challenge these allegations in the Court of Appeal which held that the decision to withdraw his commission as a minister was not subject to judicial review. In January 2010, he was appointed secretary assisting the minister for sport and recreation.
  
Stewart  was elected to the NSW Legislative Assembly on 25 March 1995, representing the electorate Lakemba. He was elected as Member for Bankstown at a general election in March 1999 and re-elected to this district in March 2003 and March 2007.

Stewart decided to not contest the 2011 state election. The Labor Party endorsed Bankstown Mayor, Tania Mihailuk, as its candidate for the election held in March 2011.

References

1956 births
Living people
Members of the New South Wales Legislative Assembly
Australian Labor Party members of the Parliament of New South Wales
Australian Labor Party councillors
City of Canterbury-Bankstown
Labor Right politicians
21st-century Australian politicians
Deputy and Assistant Speakers of the New South Wales Legislative Assembly
Deputy mayors of places in Australia